N80 may refer to:

Roads 
 Molave–Dipolog Road, in the Philippines
 N-80 National Highway, in Pakistan
 N80 road (Ireland)

Other uses 
 N80 (Long Island bus)
 Escadrille N.80, a unit of the French Air Force
 Nakkara language
 Nikon N80, a camera
 Nokia N80, a smartphone
 Toyota Hilux (N80), a Japanese pickup truck